The Raymond Buddhist Church is a building in Raymond, Alberta, Canada that has been a schoolhouse, a Jōdo Shinshū Buddhist temple, and a meetinghouse of the Church of Jesus Christ of Latter-day Saints (LDS Church). Until it closed in 2006, it was the oldest continuously used Buddhist shrine in Canada.

Early uses
Construction on the building was begun in 1902 and the building was completed in 1903. It was built by Latter-day Saint settlers of Raymond and was initially used as the settlement's first schoolhouse. It was also used as the meetinghouse for the LDS Church and for other community events. In 1910, the school moved to a larger facility and in 1929 the LDS Church completed a larger meetinghouse.

Buddhist temple
In 1929, Japanese Canadian members of the Jōdo Shinshū Buddhist faith purchased the building to use a temple, schoolhouse, and meeting place. It was the first Buddhist temple to be established in Alberta. Beginning in 1932, a co-operative store known as the "Kobai Kumiai" also operated out of the building. The store operated until the 1990s and the temple functioned until 2006, when the temple's altar and ornamentation was moved to a Buddhist temple in Lethbridge, Alberta. In 1988, the Raymond Buddhist Church was described as "one of the finest [Buddhist] shrines in North America."

Architecture and historical value
The architecture of the building has been described as "typical of the kinds of public buildings erected in early 1900s Alberta". It is the oldest building in Raymond and in 1984 was added to the Alberta Register of Historic Places.

Notes

References
Terry Watada (1996). Bukkyo Tozen: A History of Jodo Shinshu Buddhism in Canada, 1905–1995 (Toronto: HpF Press).

20th-century Latter Day Saint church buildings
Buddhist temples in Canada
Defunct schools in Canada
Former Buddhist temples
Former churches in Canada
Former Latter Day Saint religious buildings and structures
Former religious buildings and structures in Canada
Japanese-Canadian culture
Meetinghouses of the Church of Jesus Christ of Latter-day Saints
Religious buildings and structures in Alberta
Jōdo Shin temples
Religious buildings and structures completed in 1903
Raymond, Alberta
Schools in Alberta
20th-century Buddhist temples
Buildings and structures in the County of Warner No. 5
Provincial Historic Resources of Alberta
20th-century churches in Canada